Michael Heidt (born November 4, 1963) is a Canadian-born German former professional ice hockey defenceman. He was selected 27th overall by the Los Angeles Kings in the 1982 NHL Entry Draft and played 6 games with them during the 1983–84 NHL season. The rest of his career, which lasted from 1983 to 1998, was mainly spent in Germany. Internationally Heidt played with the German national team at several tournaments, including the 1992 Winter Olympics, and the 1992 and 1996 World Championships.

Career statistics

Regular season and playoffs

International

Awards
 WHL First All-Star Team – 1983

References

External links
 

1963 births
Living people
Adler Mannheim players
Calgary Canucks players
Calgary Wranglers (WHL) players
Canadian expatriate ice hockey players in Germany
EHC Bayreuth players
EV Landshut players
German ice hockey defencemen
Ice hockey players at the 1992 Winter Olympics
Los Angeles Kings draft picks
Los Angeles Kings players
Mad Dogs München players
New Haven Nighthawks players
Nova Scotia Oilers players
Olympic ice hockey players of Germany
Schwenningen ERC players
Ice hockey people from Calgary
Starbulls Rosenheim players
Toledo Goaldiggers players